Complicity in genocide is illegal under international law both for individuals, as part of international criminal law, and state parties to the Genocide Convention. The latter was first held in the Bosnian genocide case (2007) in which the International Court of Justice held Serbia responsible for failure to prevent the Bosnian genocide.

References

External links
Case law
Genocide
International criminal law